Hojjatabad or Hojatabad may refer to:

Ardabil Province
 Hojjatabad, Ardabil, a village in Germi County

Fars Province
 Hojjatabad, Darab, a village in Darab County
 Hojjatabad, Fars, a village in Mamasani County

Hormozgan Province
 Hojjatabad, Bashagard, a village in Bashagard County
 Hojjatabad, Minab, a village in Minab County
 Hojjatabad, Rudan, a village in Rudan County

Isfahan Province
 Hojjatabad, Chadegan, a village in Chadegan County
 Hojjatabad, Tiran and Karvan, a village in Tiran and Karvan County

Kerman Province
 Hojjatabad, Anar, a village in Anar County
 Hojjatabad, Anbarabad, a village in Anbarabad County
 Hojjatabad, Jebalbarez-e Jonubi, a village in Anbarabad County
 Hojjatabad, Kahnuj, a village in Kahnuj County
 Hojjatabad, Ekhtiarabad, a village in Kerman County
 Hojjatabad, Mahan, a village in Kerman County
 Hojjatabad, Shahdad, a village in Kerman County
 Hojjatabad, Zangiabad, a village in Kerman County
 Hojjatabad, Narmashir, a village in Narmashir County
 Hojjatabad, Ravar, a village in Ravar County
 Hojjatabad, Rigan, a village in Rigan County
 Hojjatabad-e Sardi, a village in Rudbar-e Jonubi County
 Hojjatabad, Sharifabad, a village in Sirjan County

Kermanshah Province
 Hojjatabad, Kermanshah, a village in Sahneh County
 Hojjatabad-e Olya, Kermanshah, a village in Kermanshah County
 Hojjatabad-e Sofla, Kermanshah, a village in Kermanshah County

Razavi Khorasan Province
 Hojjatabad, Fariman, a village in Fariman County
 Hojjatabad, Joghatai, a village in Joghatai County
 Hojjatabad, Khoshab, a village in Khoshab County
 Hojjatabad, Mashhad, a village in Mashhad County

South Khorasan Province
 Hojjatabad, Eresk, a village in Boshruyeh County
 Hojjatabad, Nehbandan, a village in Nehbandan County
 Hojjatabad, Sarayan, a village in Sarayan County
 Hojjatabad, Sarbisheh, a village in Sarbisheh County

Yazd Province
 Hojjatabad-e Sofla, Yazd, a village in Meybod County
 Hojjatabad-e Olya, Yazd, a village in Saduq County
 Hojjatabad, Garizat, a village in Taft County
 Hojjatabad, Nasrabad, a village in Taft County
 Hojjatabad, Yazd, a village in Yazd County